Engel means "angel" in some Germanic languages.

Engel or Die Engel may refer to:

People
 Engel (surname)
 Engel Beltré (born 1989), Dominican baseball player

Music
 Engel (band), a Swedish industrial/melodic death metal band
 "Engel" (song), a 1997 song by Rammstein
 "Engel", a 2014 song by Admiral P featuring Nico D
 "Engel", a 2012 song from the album Raise Your Fist by Doro

Others uses
 Engel (role-playing game), a 2002 role-playing game
 Frau Engel, a character in the Wolfenstein video game series
 Marian Engle Award, a Canadian literary award presented annually from 1986 to 2007
 Engel Stadium, a baseball stadium in Chattanooga, Tennessee, United States
 De Engel (Lisse), a community in the municipality of Lisse, South Holland, the Netherlands
 De Engel (restaurant), Rotterdam, the Netherlands

See also
 
 Engle (disambiguation)
 Engels (disambiguation)
 Engel v. Vitale, U.S. Supreme Court decision (1962)